Robbie Simpson is an Australian former professional rugby league footballer who played in the 1990s and 2000s. He played for St. George and the unified St George Illawarra Dragons in the NRL, and in the Super League he played for London Broncos  as a  forward.

Playing career
Simpson made his first grade debut for St. George in round 1 of the 1998 NRL season against Western Suburbs.  

Simpson played in St. George's final game before they formed a joint venture with the Illawarra Steelers to become St. George Illawarra.  A semi-final loss to Canterbury-Bankstown at Kogarah Oval.

Simpson's final game in the top grade came in round 26 of the 2003 NRL season as St. George defeated the Brisbane Broncos 26-25 at Suncorp Stadium.  The match was remembered for St. George player Mark Riddell kicking a penalty goal from near the halfway line to win the game before the full-time siren.

References

External links
Challenge Cup teams and profiles
Simpson's all-clear for cup final
Saints on TV 2000

1975 births
Living people
Australian rugby league players
London Broncos players
Rugby league players from Griffith, New South Wales
Rugby league second-rows
St. George Dragons players
St. George Illawarra Dragons players